Democratic Marxism is a term employed to emphasise the compatibility between democracy and Marxism. According to Kenneth Megill in his book The New Democratic Theory:
Democratic Marxism is authentic Marxism—the Marxism which emphasizes the necessity for revolutionary action. Loyalty to the movement, not loyalty to any particular doctrine, is characteristic of the orthodox democratic Marxist.

In his book Chile's Democratic Road to Socialism, Michael H. Fleet also uses the term democratic Marxism to describe the nature of the Chilean government at the time of Salvador Allende's presidency:
During at least two of the three years of democratic Marxist government, however, Chile faced severe economic and political crises.

References 

Democracy
Democratic socialism
Marxist schools of thought
Types of democracy
Types of socialism